The Atlanta Falcons are an American football team based in Atlanta, Georgia. They are members of the South division of the National Football Conference (NFC) in the National Football League (NFL). The Falcons joined the NFL as an expansion team in 1966, and have compiled an all-time record of 337 wins, 436 losses, and 6 ties. The team has won the NFC West championship twice in 1980 and 1998 and the NFC South championship 4 times in 2004, 2010, 2012 and 2016. The Falcons have appeared in two Super Bowls, losing both times; their first appearance was in Super Bowl XXXIII, with the Falcons falling to the Denver Broncos 19–34, and the second was in Super Bowl LI, where the Falcons fell to the New England Patriots 28–34 in overtime.

There have been 18 head coaches for the Falcons franchise, 13 serving full-time. Among full-time head coaches, Mike Smith is the Falcons' winningest and longest tenured head coach, with a 66–46 regular season record. Under Smith's leadership, the team attained consecutive winning seasons (11–5 in 2008 and 9–7 in 2009), consecutive playoff appearances (2010 and 2011), and consecutive seasons with 10 wins or more (also in 2010 and 2011) for the first time in franchise history. Also, Smith is the only Falcons coach to win 2 divisional titles (NFC South, 2010 and 2012).

Key

Coaches
 Note: Statistics are correct as of end of the 2022 NFL season.

Notes

References

Atlanta Falcons
 
Head coaches